Alexander Smollett (29 November 1801 – 25 February 1881) was a Scottish Conservative Party politician. He was a Member of Parliament (MP) for Dunbartonshire from 1841 to 1859.

Life

He was born at Cameron House, Bonhill in Dunbartonshire on 29 November 1801. He was the son of Elizabeth Boyle, daughter of Patrick Boyle of Shewalton and Admiral John Rouett Smollett (1767–1842). He had four sisters and a brother, Patrick Boyle. His eldest sister Elizabeth  married Charles Villiers Stuart, the younger brother of Lord Stuart of Decies.

He appears in 1827 as an advocate. In the 1830s he was working in Edinburgh as an advocate and living at 14 Gloucester Place in the Stockbridge area of the city.

In 1835 he is listed as a member of the Highland and Agriculture Society of Scotland.

In 1844 he appears on the committee of the Glasgow, Dunbarton and Loch Lomond Railway Company.

He on 25 February 1881, and was buried in the Smollett family mausoleum in Alexandria, Dumbartonshire.

References

External links 
 

1801 births
1881 deaths
People from Dunbartonshire
Members of the Parliament of the United Kingdom for Scottish constituencies
Scottish Tory MPs (pre-1912)
UK MPs 1841–1847
UK MPs 1847–1852
UK MPs 1852–1857
UK MPs 1857–1859